NK Adriatic is a Croatian football club based in the town of Split. They currently compete in 2. ŽNL, the regional league for Split-Dalmatia. The club is well known for their youth player development.

History 

NK Adriatic was founded on 25 May 2010.

Current squad

References

External links 
 Official website 

Football clubs in Croatia
Football clubs in Split, Croatia
Association football clubs established in 2010
2010 establishments in Croatia